Panadura Sports Club is a first-class cricket team based in Panadura, Sri Lanka. Their home ground is the Panadura Esplanade.

History
Panadura Sports Club has been in existence since 1924. The team has played first-class cricket since 1988–89: 265 matches, for 61 wins, 68 losses, and 136 draws. They have also played List A cricket since 1991–92: 118 matches, for 55 wins, 52 losses, 2 ties and 9 no-results.

Past Presidents
1924 – 1935 – M. J. Jayatillake
1936 – 1943 – Dr. C.W. Dias
1944 – 1947 – A. C. Goonaratne
1948 – C. A. Jansz
1949 – 1950 – W. P. H. Dias
1951 – 1953 – H. D. Perera
1954 – 1961 – Dr. A. Simon Silva
1962 – 1965 – K. J. R. Kuruppu
1966 – 1970 – Tissa Goonaratne
1971 – 1973 – Ashoka Jayatillake
1974 – 1975 – Susantha Perera
1976 – Kumara Jayatillake
1977 – 1978 – C. Neil D. Perera
1979 – 1980 – P. Fonseka
1981 – 1983 – Chandra Karunanayake
1984 – Timothy Weeraratne
1985 – Gaurie Wickramasinghe
1986 – 1990 – Mahinda Seneviratne
1991 – Cecil Perera
1992 – Douglas De Fonseka
1993 – Chandra Karunanayake
1994 – 1998 – Mahinda Seneviratne
1999 – 2002 – M. Anurath Abeyratne
2003 – 2004 – Mahinda Seneviratne
2005 – 2015 – Ravin Wickramaratne
2015 to Date – Jayantha Silva

International representatives
Don Anurasiri– Test & One Day International (Sri Sumangala College Panadura )
Ravindra Pushpakumara – Test & One Day International ( St John's College Panadura )
Charitha Buddhika – Test & One Day International ( St John's College Panadura )
 chamara silva - test & One day , T20 international  ( Panadura Royal College ) 
 indika Gallage - test , One day international (Sri Sumangala College Panadura )
Dilruwan Perera – Test, One Day & T 20 International (Sri Sumangala College Panadura)

References

External links
 Cricinfo
 Panadura Sports Club at CricketArchive

Sri Lankan first-class cricket teams
Buildings and structures in Panadura
Panadura